Korouni is a Southern Kurdish dialect of Fars and Kurdistan.
Koruni is a Kurdish tribe of Kurdistan and Fars. Most of the tribe was transplanted from Kurdistan to Fars by Karim Khan Zand during the 1760s.

The speakers of Korouni live in scattered pockets in Southern Iranian Fars province around Shiraz, Sepidan and Kazerun. The succeeding information is about the dialect spoken around the latter two cities.

See also
 Kuruni (tribe)
 Koruni, Shiraz
 Dialects of Fars
 Northwestern Iranian languages
 Iranian languages

References

Fars Province
Kurdish language
Northwestern Iranian languages
Endangered Iranian languages